The 6th Alpini Regiment is a training regiment of the Italian Army's mountain infantry speciality, the Alpini, which distinguished itself in combat during World War I and World War II. The regiment is based in Bruneck and assigned to the Alpine Training Center.

History

Formation 
The 6th Alpini Regiment was formed on 1 November 1882. It consisted of three battalions: Val d'Orco, Val d'Aosta, and Val Tagliamento, named after the valleys from which their soldiers were recruited. On 1 April 1885 the regiment ceded the "Val d'Orco" and "Val d'Aosta" battalions to the 4th Alpini Regiment and received the "Val Schio" battalion from the 2nd Alpini Regiment, the "Monte Lessini" battalion from the 3rd Alpini Regiment and the "Val Brenta" battalion from the 4th Alpini Regiment. 

In 1886 battalions were renamed, taking as new names the location of their logistic depot: Verona, Vicenza, Bassano, Pieve di Cadore, and Gemona. The same year the regiment raised the Alpini Battalion "Feltre". By now the regiment had become too complex and therefore it was split on 1 August 1887: the regimental command and the battalions "Feltre", "Gemona", and "Pieve di Cadore" formed in Conegliano the 7th Alpini Regiment.

World War I 

The 6th Alpini Regiment saw its first action in 1911 during the Italo-Turkish War, fighting Ottoman forces in the Libya. During World War I the regiment consisted of ten battalions and saw heavy fighting in the Alps regions of the Italian front against Austro-Hungarian and German forces. During the war the regiment consisted of the following battalions (pre-war battalions in bold, followed by their first and second line reserve battalions):

  Verona, Val d'Adige, Monte Baldo
  Vicenza, Val Leogra, Monte Berico, Monte Pasubio
  Bassano, Val Brenta, Sette Comuni

During the Battle of Caporetto in October 1917 and the following retreat to the Piave river the Val Leogra was destroyed. During the war 201 officers and 3,294 soldiers of the regiment were killed, and 460 officers and 8,670 soldiers were wounded. The regiment's battalions were awarded six Silver Medals of Military Valour during the war, one of which was shared between the Verona, Bassano, Monte Baldo, and Sette Comuni battalions for their conduct during the battle of Monte Ortigara.

Interwar years 
On 21 November 1919 the Alpini Battalion "Vicenza" was transferred to the newly formed 9th Alpini Regiment. On 1 September 1920 the Alpini Battalion "Trento" was raised by the 5th Alpini Regiment, which on 1 July 1921 was transferred together with the Alpini Battalion "Vestone" to the 6th Alpini Regiment. On 10 September 1935, the 2nd Alpine Division "Tridentina" was formed, which consisted of the 5th Alpini Regiment, 6th Alpini Regiment, and 2nd Mountain Artillery Regiment. On 11 April 1937 the battalions "Bassano" and "Trento" were transferred to the newly formed 11th Alpini Regiment and the 6th Alpini reformed the Alpini Battalion "Val Chiese" as replacement.

World War II 

On 21 June 1940 (one day before the French surrender) the Tridentina advanced with other Italian units into Southern France. Later in 1940 the division was then sent to Albania, where it sustained heavy losses in the Greco-Italian War. In April 1941 the German Wehrmacht came to the aid of the beaten Italian armies in Albania through the invasion of Yugoslavia. Afterwards the Tridentina was repatriated for rest and refit.

In September 1942 the Tridentina under command of General Luigi Reverberi was sent with the 3rd Alpine Division "Julia", 4th Alpine Division "Cuneense" and other Italian units to the Soviet Union to form the Italian Army in Russia ( abbreviated as ARMIR) and fight alongside the German Wehrmacht against the Red Army. Taking up positions along the Don River, the Italian units covered part of the left flank of the German Sixth Army, which spearheaded the German summer offensive of 1942 into the city of Stalingrad.

After successfully encircling the German Sixth army in Stalingrad the Red Army's attention turned to the Italian units along the Don. On 14 January 1943, the Soviet Operation Little Saturn began and the three alpine division found themselves quickly encircled by rapidly advancing armored Soviet Forces. The Alpini held the front on the Don, but within three days the Soviets had advanced 200 km to the left and right of the Alpini. On the evening of 17 January the commanding officer of the Italian Mountain Corps General Gabriele Nasci ordered a full retreat. At this point the Julia and Cuneense divisions were already heavily decimated and only the Tridentina was still capable of conducting combat operations. As the Soviets had already occupied every village bitter battles had to be fought to clear the way out of the encirclement. The remnants of the Tridentina were able to break the Soviet encirclement in the Battle of Nikolayevka on 26 January 1943, allowing 4,250 Tridentina survivors (out of 15,000 troops deployed) to reach German lines, which were reached on the morning of 28 January. By then the men of the 6th Alpini Regiment had walked 200 km, fought in 20 battles and spent 11 nights camped out in the middle of the Steppe. Temperatures during the nights were between -30 °C and -40 °C. 

The few survivors of the 6th Alpini Regiment were repatriated and after the signing of the Armistice of Cassibile on 8 September 1943, the regiment was dissolved on 10 September 1943 in the village of Franzensfeste.

Cold War 

After World War II the 6th Alpini Regiment was reformed on 16 April 1946, in the city of Meran with the battalions "Edolo", "Bolzano" and "Trento". The regiment was the infantry component of the newly formed Alpine Brigade "Tridentina". In 1951 the reformed Alpini Battalion "Bassano" joined the 6th Alpini Regiment, while the Alpini Battalion "Edolo" was transferred on 1 January 1953 to the reformed 5th Alpini Regiment.

During the 1975 army reform the army disbanded the regimental level and newly independent battalions were given for the first time their own flags. On 30 September 1975 the 6th Alpini Regiment was disbanded and on the same day the regiment's Alpini Battalion "Bassano" in Innichen was assigned the flag and traditions of the 6th Alpini Regiment.

Before being disbanded in 1975 the structure of the 6th Alpini Regiment was as follows:

  6th Alpini Regiment, in Bruneck
  Command and Services Company, in Bruneck
  Alpini Battalion "Bolzano", in Brixen
  92nd Alpini Company
  141st Alpini Company
  142nd Alpini Company
  127th Mortar Company
  Alpini Battalion "Trento", in Welsberg
  94th Alpini Company
  144th Alpini Company
  145th Alpini Company
  128th Mortar Company
  Alpini Battalion "Bassano", in Innichen
  62nd Alpini Company
  63rd Alpini Company
  74th Alpini Company
  129th Mortar Company

Current structure 
On 15 January 1993 the Alpini Battalion "Bassano" was elevated to 6th Alpini Regiment without changing size or composition. In autumn 2002 6th Alpini Regiment was transferred to the Alpine Training Center. As of 2022 the regiment functions as a NATO-wide high altitude warfare training centre and administers the military training areas in the Puster Valley. Its structure as of 2022 is:

  Regimental Command, in Bruneck
  Logistic Support Company, in Bruneck
  Alpini Battalion "Bassano"
  62nd Alpini Company "La Valanga", in Bruneck
  74th Training Company "La Travolgente", in Innichen

Military honors 
After World War II the President of Italy awarded the 6th Alpini Regiment Italy's highest military honor, the Gold Medal of Military Valour, for the regiment's conduct and sacrifice during the Italian campaign on the Eastern Front:

  Italian campaign on the Eastern Front, awarded 31 December 1947

See also 
 Italian Army
 COMALP

External links 
 Italian Army Website: 6° Reggimento Alpini
 6th Alpini Regiment on vecio.it

Sources 
 Franco dell'Uomo, Rodolfo Puletti: L'Esercito Italiano verso il 2000 - Volume Primo - Tomo I, Rome 1998, Stato Maggiore dell'Esercito - Ufficio Storico, page: 478

References 

Alpini regiments of Italy
Regiments of Italy in World War I
Regiments of Italy in World War II
Military units and formations established in 1882
Military units and formations disestablished in 1943
Military units and formations established in 1946
Military units and formations disestablished in 1975
Military units and formations established in 1993